Max H. Whittier (1867–1925) was an American real estate developer and a pioneer in the early California petroleum industry.

Biography
Max Whittier (born Mericos Hector Whittier), was born to Charles G. Whittier and Ruth Keech, came to California from Maine at the age of 24 and settled in the Santa Paula region where he secured a job as a farm hand. He would later acquire a position with the Union Oil Company where he attained a good knowledge of the oil business. When oil was discovered in Los Angeles, Whittier associated himself with Thomas A. O'Donnell in a co-partnership as drilling well contractors. After gaining enough knowledge, the partnership was ended and each branched out in independent interests drilling wells in the Coalinga oil fields. After abandoning the Coalinga interests for brighter prospects in the Kern River region he was instrumental in organizing the Green & Whittier Oil Company, Kern Oil Company and the Shamrock Oil Company. Later these companies merged into the Associated Oil Company, where Whittier was the largest stockholder and was on the board of directors. The Associated Oil Company was one of the largest in the state of California, having its own pipeline, shops and marketing facilities. It led to the formation of the Whittier Oil Company, which in 1979 was sold to Shell Oil.

As well as holding interests in those companies, Whittier was a large stockholder and director of Rodeo Land and Water Company which held 3,100 acres in the areas of which would become Beverly Hills, as well as the Amalgamated Oil Company, Titicaca Oil Company, and the Inca Oil Company as well as several more interests in Oklahoma. He also acquired large areas of land in the Lost Hills districts helping organize the Belridge Oil Company, which held 31,000 acres in that district.

In 1935, his family started the Whittier Trust Company, a multi-family office and state-chartered wealth management company.

The Whittier Mansion
The Whittier Mansion, on a  plot on Sunset Boulevard, gained notoriety after its purchase in 1978 by Saudi Sheik Mohammed al Fassi, who boldly redecorated the Spanish-style mansion, painting the property’s classical statues, visible from the street, in flesh tones – genitalia and all. The garish painted statues turned the mansion into a tourist attraction until it was heavily damaged in a 1980 fire and torn down five years later. The Jerk was filmed at this mansion.

References

American businesspeople in the oil industry
1928 deaths
People from Caribou, Maine
Businesspeople from Maine
1867 births